Yazin Nizar, also credited as Yasin, is an Indian playback singersinging predominantly in Telugu, Tamil, Malayalam, Kannada and Hindi -language films, with over 600 film songs with several multi lingual chart busters. Yazin has rendered film songs composed by AR Rahman, Ilaiyaraaja, Amit Trivedi, Vidyasagar, Devi Sri Prasad, M. M. Keeravani,Tanishq baghchi, Mani Sharma, G. V. Prakash Kumar,D Immaan , Yuvan Shankar Raja, Ghibran, Ouseppachan, Rahul Raj, Vijay Antony, M. Jayachandran, Sharreth, Bijibal, and Gopi Sundar. He has rendered film songs in several Indian languages and  won multiple Mirchi Music Awards,Raga pratibha award,  Swaralaya-Kairali yesudas award(Gandharva sangeetam) and multiple Filmfare nominations over the years and is the voice in some of the major hits in biggest indian  movies releases like RRR(naattukootthu , Dosti) and bali bali Babubali and also the voice of popular indie sound tracks like neeye, neeve and neene, yaathi yaathi and bin tere. He also sang and featured in the hindi song "zindigi" from the movie angry babies and also performed live concerts in many countries including USA,Canada,UAE, Malalsia,UK  etc.
Avatha payya in paradesi ,jananam jananam in goli soda,Yavvana in satya  are some his critically acllaimed songs in tamizh cinema and also have sung in landmark movies in malayalam like Thattathin marayath (pranante nalangal ) and the meodious "sajalamai" which won multiple award nominations that year.He also sang kolussu thenni which is touted to be the most expensive malayalam film song shot in malayalam, along with shreya ghoshal and tipu.Yazin has also rendered hits in telugu movies for super stars like Mahesh babu( charusheela, o vasumati, nuvve samastham),Allu Arjun(seetakalam), Jr NTR( apple beauty ), Ravi Teja( allabe alabe), Venkatesh (babu bangaram) and cheeni chillale in tamizh for vikram starrrer sketch and  kamal hassan starrter uthama villan and thoongavanam , Mammooty starrer Praise the lord(sharon vaniyil) and Mamangam and Mohanlal's arattu (onnam kandam).He sang also sung multi cultural devotional songs in malayalam,telugu and tamizh.

Early life and career

He was awarded Kalapraibha in state and regional CBSE youth festivals and was also the winner of major TV competitions like Gandharva Sangeetham, Sangeetha Maha Yudham and Apple Megastars in his teenage. A dual MBA and SCM graduate, he was awarded kalapraibha in state and regional CBSE youth festivals and was also winner of Gandharva Sangeetham, Sangeetha Maha Yudham and Apple Megastars and began singing live. 
He has sung in several languages – Tamil, Telugu, Malayalam, Kannada and Hindi. "Charusheela" from the Telugu blockbuster Sreemanthudu was one of the biggest hits of 2015, as was "Yavvana" from the Tamil film Satya and "Kolussu Thenni" from the Malayalam film Cousins. His songs for Telugu films such as "Meghalu Lekunna" (Kumari 21F), "Seetakalam" (Son of Satyamurthy), "Apple Beauty" (Janata Garage), "O Sitara" (Winner), "O Vasumathi" (Bharat Ane Nenu), "Nalo Chilipi Kala" (Lover), "I Love You Too" (Shivam), and "Oka Poota Annam Kosam" (Bichagadu) are very popular. His other popular songs include "Avatha Payya" from the critically acclaimed movie Paradesi in GV Prakash's music, the track "Jayalakshmi" from Saithan, "Sajalamai" from the movie 101 Weddings in Deepak Dev's music, and "Veyil Poyal" from Bhaiya Bhaiya, composed by Vidyasagar.

In 2017, he sang the superhit multilingual track "Neeye, Neeve and Neene", composed by Phani Kalyan, in Tamil, Telugu and Kannada, and also ventured into indie music with this song. Also the winner of Swaralaya-kairali Gandharvasangeetham, Apple megastars and sangeetha, mahayudham in younger days. He is an MBA in finance and marketing graduate from AMIMA in 2012. Yazin was awarded with Best Playback Singer of the Year at the Mirchi Music Awards in 2016 for the song "Meghalu" from the movie Kumari 21F. He was also a two-time Filmfare nominee and the Best Upcoming Singer award winner at MMA South and GAMA Dubai.

Awards and nominations

MLC Awards

[[Outstanding Achievement Award [Winner]] (2020)
Best song kanapadava-Manasanamaha (2020)
Mirchi Music Awards South 2016 - Winner for Best Singer of the Year
Mirchi Music Awards South 2015 - Winner for Best Upcoming Singer
Nominated for Filmfare Award for Best Male Playback Singer – Telugu for "Charusheela" from Srimanthudu
Nominated for Filmfare Award for Best Male Playback Singer – Telugu for "Meghalu" from Kumari 21F
Mirchi Music Awards South 2021 -  Winner for Best Song of the Decade Kannada for "Ninna Danigagi"
Raga pratibha awards 2015 - Winner
Swaralaya Kairali Yesudas award for the best upcoming male voice   2002-2003 
Mirchi Music Awards South 2021 -*Nominated for singer of the decade

Notable movies

Telugu discography

Tamil discography

Malayalam discography

Kannada discography

Hindi playback,  singles  and indie music videos

|}

References

External links
 Official Facebook Page

Telugu playback singers
Living people
Tamil playback singers
Malayalam playback singers
Musicians from Kollam
Indian male playback singers
Year of birth missing (living people)
Singers from Kerala